Dióskál is a village in Keszthely District of Zala County in Hungary.

References

Populated places in Zala County